Jennie Escalada Gabriel (born 11 August 1987) is a Filipino singer, actress, comedienne, and television personality. She first rose to prominence after being one of the finalists of various singing competitions such as ABS-CBN's Tawag ng Tanghalan, GMA's Pinoy Pop Superstar, and The Clash, where she ended as the season's first runner-up.

Life and career

Early beginnings
Gabriel was first introduced as Jennie Escalada when she joined the third season of Pinoy Pop Superstar in 2006 where she was one of the grand finalists. 

In 2016, Gabriel competed in the first season of ABS-CBN's singing competition, Tawag ng Tanghalan where she was an eight-time defending champion and became one of the grand finalists. During the course of the competition, she also showcased her skills in impersonating television and music personalities such as actress Angel Locsin. This comedic skill opened a lot of projects for Gabriel in the network such as roles in Celebrity Playtime, Dok Ricky, Pedia, and The Good Son.

In 2019, a viral video of Gabriel surfaced with her impersonating Filipino music personalities such as Jaya, Lani Misalucha, and Vina Morales. She was later dubbed as the "Diva with a Million Voices" and had several television guestings of her showcasing this skill.

The Clash and signing up with GMA Network
In 2020, Gabriel competed in the third season of GMA Network's The Clash. She was the first one to eliminated but got back in the competition after being the wildcard and eventually ended as the season's runner-up. 

After the competition, Gabriel was signed by GMA Artist Center and later joined the musical variety show, All-Out Sundays, wherein she is now a mainstay performer.

The Clash 2020 (Season 3) Full Performances

Filmography

Television

References

External links 
 
 Sparkle profile

1987 births
People from Makati
21st-century Filipino women singers
Living people
Filipino women pop singers
Filipino women comedians
Participants in Philippine reality television series
GMA Network personalities
GMA Music artists
Filipino television actresses